Hristo Atanasov Bonev (born 3 February 1947), also known as Zuma, is a Bulgarian footballer manager and former player who last managed Lokomotiv Plovdiv in the Bulgarian A PFG. One of the greatest Bulgarian footballers, Bonev was renowned for his vision and technique.

Club career

Bonev started his career at Lokomotiv Plovdiv in 1964 where he played until 1981 with a brief spell at CSKA Sofia in 1967. During his spell at Lokomotiv Plovdiv, he became their star player, while also was called to play for the national team. 

In 1981 he moved to Greece to play for AEK Athens. In AEK, his offer was meager, due to his knee injury, which, among other things, cost him his career. He stayed at AEK for 1 and a half years completing 10 official appearances. He left in the summer of 1982 suffering from a knee injury, although events proved that he wanted to try his luck in England and Oxford United offered him a trial but with a better-paying contract option. In order to obtain his freedom then, he convinced the president of the club Zafiropoulos by proposing his compatriot Angel Kolev with a small amount of money, but just like Bonev, he didn't help the team. The experiment in England did not catch on, as Bonev was betrayed by his knee and so he left Oxford with just 3 appearances in pre-season friendlies.

He returned to Lokomotiv Plovdiv to end his career in 1984 at the age of 37. Bonev has played in 404 games and has scored 180 goals in the A group for Lokomotiv Plovdiv. He has played also 14 games and has scored 6 goals in the UEFA Cup with the smurfs. Bonev won the Cup of the Soviet Army in 1983, he is also vice-champion of Bulgaria for 1973, with two more bronze medals won - in 1969 and 1974.

International career
Bonev played for the Bulgaria national team 96 times, scoring a record 48 goals, between 1967 and 1979. He played for his country at the 1970 and 1974 World Cups.

Managerial career

Before ending his career at Lokomotiv Plovdiv Bonev played as a player-coach for a season. After his retirement he became a manager and initially went to Greece and became coach of Panathinaikos in 1988, where he won the Greek Championship in 1990 and he is chosen for the Manager of the season in Greece.

Then he managed AEL for 3 seasons following a year at Ionikos, where he won the second division league and got his club promoted to the first division. After Greece, he became manager of the Cypriot team APOEL in 1995 and until 1996 when he quit from his team, he won the Cypriot Cup in his first year in Cyprus in 1995 and the Double the following season.

He went back to his home country to become manager of Lokomotiv Sofia and then he was appointed as head coach to his country's national team for the 1998 FIFA World Cup. Despite a disappointing showing in France, with only one point achieved from three games, he continued as national coach, but after a 3–0 defeat to Poland in the first qualifying match for Euro 2000 in September 1998, he decided to resign from his post, stating "I believe I have taken the team as far as I am able, and now it is time for the players to respond to someone else who, I hope, can improve our results."

Honours

As a player

Lokomotiv Plovdiv
Cup of the Soviet Army (1): 1983

As a manager

Panathinaikos
Alpha Ethniki: 1989–90

Ionikos
Beta Ethniki: 1993–94

APOEL
Cypriot First Division: 1995–96
Cypriot Cup: 1995–96, 1994–95

Individual
Bulgarian Footballer of the Year (3): 1969, 1972, 1973
Best Bulgarian Footballer of 20th century: Third place
Best Footballer of Plovdiv for 20th century
Stara Planina Orden – 1st Class
Honorary citizen of Plovdiv
Manager of the year in Greece: 1989–90
Source:

International goals
Scores and results list Bulgaria's goal tally first, score column indicates score after each Bonev goal.

Notes
 Some sources credit Bonev's second goal as an own-goal by Nikos Kovis.

References

1947 births
Living people
Footballers from Plovdiv
AEK Athens F.C. players
Expatriate football managers in Cyprus
Bulgarian football managers
Bulgarian footballers
PFC CSKA Sofia players
PFC Lokomotiv Plovdiv players
First Professional Football League (Bulgaria) players
Panathinaikos F.C. managers
1970 FIFA World Cup players
1974 FIFA World Cup players
1998 FIFA World Cup managers
Bulgaria international footballers
Bulgarian expatriate footballers
Expatriate footballers in Greece
Bulgarian expatriate sportspeople in Greece
Super League Greece players
Bulgaria national football team managers
Bulgarian expatriate football managers
Ionikos F.C. managers
APOEL FC managers
PFC Lokomotiv Plovdiv managers
FC Lokomotiv 1929 Sofia managers
Association football midfielders
Expatriate football managers in Greece